Yahya Abd-al-Latif Ayyash (6 March 1966 – 5 January 1996) was the chief bombmaker of Hamas and the leader of the West Bank battalion of the Izz ad-Din al-Qassam Brigades. In that capacity, he earned the nickname the Engineer (transliterated al-Muhandis). Ayyash is credited with advancing the technique of suicide bombing in the Israeli–Palestinian conflict. The bombings he orchestrated caused the deaths of approximately 90 Israelis, many of them civilians. He was assassinated by Shin Bet on 5 January 1996.

Ayyash is celebrated by local Palestinian communities who have named streets and other locales in his honor.

Early life
Ayyash was born in Rafat on 6 March 1966, the eldest of three brothers. As a child, he was very pious, receiving an award from the Islamic Trust for his talent in memorizing the Quran. 

As a boy, Ayyash showed a talent for electrical and mechanical work—repairing radios, television sets, and the like. After graduating from high school in 1985, he entered Birzeit University in 1987. He received a bachelor of science degree in electrical engineering in 1991.

Described as "well educated, ambitious, and soft-spoken," Ayyash hailed from a relatively affluent family. Married, with one child, Ayyash had planned to study for a master's degree in Jordan, but was denied permission to do so by Israeli authorities. It was around this time he joined Hamas.

Work for Hamas
Ayyash built the bombs used in a number of Hamas suicide attacks: the Mehola Junction bombing, the Afula Bus massacre, the Hadera central station massacre, the Tel Aviv bus 5 massacre, the Egged bus 36 bombing, the Ramat Gan bus 20 bombing, and the Jerusalem bus 26 bombing. As part of a strategic alliance between Hamas and Palestinian Islamic Jihad, Ayyash built the bombs used by Islamic Jihad at the Beit Lid massacre.

Because TNT and other high explosives were generally not available in the Palestinian territories (the West Bank and Gaza strip), Ayyash often used a combination of acetone and detergent, both commonly available household products. When combined, they form acetone peroxide, an explosive known as "Mother of Satan" for its instability.

Ramat Ef'al
Ayyash first came to the attention of Israeli security forces as a result of the failed bombing of Ramat Ef'al. Following a high-speed chase, three would-be Hamas suicide bombers were arrested by police. When police inspected their car, they found it rigged with a bomb—five  gasoline tanks filled to capacity, connected to an acetone peroxide-based detonator. 

After evacuating the area, sappers used a robot armed with a shotgun to shoot the detonator, in the hopes of defusing it. Instead, it detonated, in a massive explosion. Police investigators "were sure that if it had been detonated in a crowded area, it would have killed hundreds".

Israeli investigators learned Ayyash's name during subsequent interrogation of the three arrested suspects.

Assassination
Following the assassination of Yitzhak Rabin, the Palestinian Authority began to cooperate more closely with Shin Bet in hunting Ayyash. Shin Bet learned (through means that remain classified ) that Ayyash had, on occasion, spent the night in the Gaza City home of Osama Hamad, a childhood friend of his. Shin Bet had previously had dealings with Kamil Hamad, Osama Hamad's uncle.

In October 1995, Shin Bet operatives approached Kamil Hamad, who demanded money and Israeli identity cards for himself and his wives. After the Shin Bet operatives threatened to inform Hamas of his betrayal, Hamad agreed to cooperate. Shin Bet agents gave Hamad a cell phone, and told him it was bugged so they could listen in on Ayyash's conversations. They did not tell Hamad that, in addition to eavesdropping devices, it also contained 15 grams of RDX explosive.

Kamil Hamad gave the phone to his nephew Osama, knowing that Ayyash regularly used Osama's phones. 

At 08:00 on 5 January 1996, Ayyash's father called him. Ayyash picked it up and talked with his father. Overhead, an Israeli plane picked up their conversation and relayed it to an Israeli command post. When it was confirmed that it was Ayyash on the phone, Shin Bet remotely detonated it, killing Ayyash instantly. He was killed in Beit Lahia.

Israel has a policy that it never confirms or denies its participation in targeted killings. Per this policy, Israel did not confirm or deny its role in killing Ayyash. This led to wild rumors and speculations as to the extent of their involvement. 

In 2012, former Shin Bet director Carmi Gillon confirmed the story in the documentary [[The Gatekeepers (film)|The Gatekeepers]]. Kamil Hamad has disappeared; the Israeli press speculates that for betraying Ayyash he received US$1 million, a fake passport and a visa to the US.

Aftermath
Following Ayyash's death, four suicide bombings killed seventy-eight Israelis in February and March 1996. The first of these took place shortly after the end of the 40-day mourning period for Ayyash and the cell that claimed responsibility called itself "Disciples of the martyr Yahya 'Ayyash", stating it was a revenge attack for his assassination. Israeli security services who later interrogated one of the organizers of the attacks said they were carried out by a sub-group of the Qassam Brigades, and that, "the attacks were most probably a direct reaction to the assassination of 'Ayyash [with] no far-reaching political goal."

Veneration in Palestinian societyThe Militant'', an international communist newsweekly, reported that "100,000 Palestinians... attended the funeral". Yasser Arafat, president of the Palestinian National Authority (PA), offered his condolences to Hamas leaders. In a speech soon after the death, Arafat praised Ayyash as a martyr and blamed Israel for his assassination.

In April 2010, Israel's Channel 10 reported that the Palestinian Authority named a street in Ramallah after Ayyash. The future presidential compound of the PA is being built on the street. Only a few weeks earlier, a square in Ramallah was named after the Palestinian militant Dalal Mughrabi who directed the 1978 Coastal Road massacre. PA sources said the PA did not intend to name the street after Ayyash. The Ramallah Municipality stated that the street name had been chosen at the end of the 1990s shortly after Ayyash's death. 

In response, Israel, the United States and Canada condemned the Palestinian Authority. The Israeli Prime Minister's Office called it an "outrageous glorification of terrorism by the Palestinian Authority" while a U.S. State Department spokesperson stated "we also strongly condemn the glorification of terrorists. Honoring terrorists who have murdered innocent civilians either by official statements or by the dedication of public places hurts peace efforts and must end."

The PA had previously named streets in Jenin and Beit Lahia as well as square in Jericho in honor of Ayyash.

References

Bibliography

External links

1966 births
1996 deaths
Hamas military members
Birzeit University alumni
Palestinian electrical engineers
Assassinated Palestinian people
Palestinian militants
Suicide bombing in the Israeli–Palestinian conflict
Palestinian mass murderers
People from Rafat, Salfit
Palestinian murder victims
Assassinated Hamas members
20th-century engineers